Clampitt is a surname. Notable people with the surname include:

 Amy Clampitt (1920–1994), American poet and author
 Edward A. Clampitt (1868–1919), American pioneer oilman
 Jaime Clampitt (born 1976), Canadian boxer
 James Clampitt, English rugby player

See also
Clampett (disambiguation)